Gunsmoke Mesa is a 1944 American Western film directed by Harry L. Fraser and written by Elmer Clifton. The film stars Dave O'Brien, James Newill, Guy Wilkerson, Patti McCarty, Jack Ingram and Kermit Maynard. The film was released on September 1, 1944, by Producers Releasing Corporation.

The film was the last appearance in the "Texas Ranger" film series by James Newill, who left to do Sadie Thompson on Broadway and was replaced by Tex Ritter.

Plot

Cast          
Dave O'Brien as Tex Wyatt 
James Newill as Jim Steele
Guy Wilkerson as Panhandle Perkins
Patti McCarty as Joan Royal
Jack Ingram as Henry Black
Kermit Maynard as Sam Sneed
Robert Barron as Bill Moore
Richard Alexander as Frank Lear 
Michael Vallon as Judge Plymouth
Roy Brent as Deputy Mace Page
Jack Rockwell as Sheriff Horner

See also
The Texas Rangers series:
 The Rangers Take Over (1942)
 Bad Men of Thunder Gap (1943)
 West of Texas (1943)
 Border Buckaroos (1943)
 Fighting Valley (1943)
 Trail of Terror (1943)
 The Return of the Rangers (1943)
 Boss of Rawhide (1943)
 Outlaw Roundup (1944)
 Guns of the Law (1944)
 The Pinto Bandit (1944)
 Spook Town (1944)
 Brand of the Devil (1944)
 Gunsmoke Mesa (1944)
 Gangsters of the Frontier (1944)
 Dead or Alive (1944)
 The Whispering Skull (1944)
 Marked for Murder (1945)
 Enemy of the Law (1945)
 Three in the Saddle (1945)
 Frontier Fugitives (1945)
 Flaming Bullets (1945)

References

External links
 

1944 films
1940s English-language films
American Western (genre) films
1944 Western (genre) films
Producers Releasing Corporation films
Films directed by Harry L. Fraser
American black-and-white films
1940s American films